Gli amanti sposi is an opera giocosa in 3 acts by Ermanno Wolf-Ferrari to a libretto by Luigi Sugana, Giuseppe Pizzolato, Enrico Golisciani and Giovacchino Forzano, after Carlo Goldoni's Il ventaglio (1765). It premiered 19 February 1925 at La Fenice, Venice.

References

Operas by Ermanno Wolf-Ferrari
Italian-language operas
1925 operas
Operas
Operas based on plays
Operas based on works by Carlo Goldoni